Mary Beyt (born 1959) is an American artist known for her work in abstract painting. 

Beyt's work is included in the Whitney Museum of American Art.

References

External links
 Mary Beyt on Artnet

1959 births
20th-century American women artists
21st-century American women artists
Living people